(also , "John Paul") is the accepted name of a character in Dante's Divine Comedy.

Ciampolo appears in Canto XXII of the Inferno, where he is a grafter in the fifth ditch of the eighth circle. Threatened by the devils, Ciampolo tells Dante the identity of some of the other grafters punished there. Ciampolo eventually tricks the devils, and makes his escape back to the boiling pitch.

Dante does not identify Ciampolo by name, but his name was provided by early commentators. Nothing else is really known about him other than the information provided by Dante: that he was born in Navarre, that his father was a wastrel, and that he served King Theobald II of Navarre.

References

External links
Original text and commentaries across centuries of Canto 22, line 48 and following, from Dartmouth Dante Project.

Male characters in literature
Characters in the Divine Comedy
13th-century people from the Kingdom of Navarre